Joseph II of Jerusalem was the patriarch of the Church of Jerusalem from 981 to 985. Little is known of his life. It was during his episcopate that Sadaqah Ibn Bishr, the Patriarchal syncellus, was able to complete the renovation of the Church of the Holy Sepulchre that had been damaged by fire during riots in 966. 

Joseph was a philosopher and a physician as well as a generous almsgiver. 

In 985, he, like Christodulus II earlier, died in Cairo.

References 

10th-century patriarchs of Jerusalem
Melkites in the Fatimid Caliphate
10th-century people from the Fatimid Caliphate
985 deaths